The Pamlico Formation is a geologic formation in North Carolina. It preserves fossils dating back to the Neogene period. The name was suggested by L.W. Stephenson in the North Carolina Geological and Economic Survey journal in 1912

See also

 List of fossiliferous stratigraphic units in North Carolina

References
 

Neogene geology of North Carolina